Hanover Beach is an unincorporated community in Hanover Township, Jefferson County, Indiana.

Hanover Beach is a riverfront community near Hanover, Indiana, hence the name.

Geography

References

Unincorporated communities in Jefferson County, Indiana
Unincorporated communities in Indiana
Indiana populated places on the Ohio River